Germaine Rouillard (4 August 1888 – 1 September 1946) was a 20th-century French byzantinist specializing in philology.

Biography 
The daughter of a wealthy and educated pharmacist of Argenton-sur-Creuse where she spent her childhood, she was well educated in Indre and Paris then was a librarian at the Sorbonne. In 1923 she obtained her State doctorate in literature at the Faculté of Paris. She was never elected a female professor at the Sorbonne but became the first woman to hold a chair, that of Byzantine philology at the École pratique des hautes études where she would make all her academic career. She was specialized in papyrology and Byzantine philology.

Selected works 
1923: L'administration civile de l’Égypte byzantine, preface by Charles Diehl, 268 p., P. Gauthier, Paris, doctorate thesis
1923: Les papyrus grecs de Vienne, inventaire des documents publiés, H. Champion, Paris, complementary thesis
1937: Actes de Lavru, édition diplomatique et critique by Germaine Rouillard and Paul Collomp, in Archives de l'Athos, vol. I, (p. 897–1178), L. Lethielleux, Paris.
1932: Les taxes maritimes et commerciales d'après les actes de Patnos et de Lavru, in Mélanges Charles Diehl, tome I, (p. 277–289)
1953: La vie rurale dans l'Empire byzantin, 207 p., Adrien Maisonneuve, Paris, (posthumous).

Bibliography 
1929: R. Draguet, "Compte-rendu de L'administration civile de l'Egypte byzantine", in Revue belge de philosophie et d'histoire, volume VIII, (p. 246–248).
1932: R. Guillaud, "Compte-rendu de Les taxes maritimes et commerciales d'après les actes de Patnos et de Lavru", in Annales d'histoire économique et sociale,  (p. 429–430), volume IV, n° 6.
1947: Claire Préaux, "Germaine Rouillard", Chronique d'Égypte 22, n° 43,  (p. 174–176).
1954: R. Jannin, "Compte-rendu de La vie rurale dans l'empire byzantin", in Revue des études byzantines, volume XII, n° 12,  (p. 221–222)
2010: "Germaine Rouillard", in Argentonnais connus et méconnus,  (p. 56), Cercle d'histoire d'Argenton-sur-Creuse, Argenton.

External links 
 Germaine Rouillard on data.bnf.fr
 L’administration civile de l'Égypte byzantine on Persée
 Germaine Rouilllars on IdRef

French Byzantinists
French papyrologists
Academic staff of the École pratique des hautes études
1888 births
People from Creuse
1946 deaths